Klaudia Siciarz (pronounced ; born 15 March 1998) is a Polish athlete specialising in the sprint hurdles. In February 2017 she ran 8.00 seconds in the 60 metres hurdles which was the world U20 record until being broken by Tara Davis with 7.98 the following indoor season. In addition, she won a bronze medal in the 100 metres hurdles at the 2017 European U20 Championships and the silver at the 2019 European U23 Championships.

Her personal bests are 12.82 seconds in the 100 metres hurdles (+1.8 m/s, Gävle 2019) and 7.95 seconds in the 60 metres hurdles (Toruń 2019).

International competitions

References

1998 births
Living people
Polish female hurdlers
Sportspeople from Kraków
Polish Athletics Championships winners
Athletes (track and field) at the 2020 Summer Olympics
Olympic athletes of Poland
20th-century Polish women
21st-century Polish women